Rudolf Minger (13 November 1881 – 23 August 1955) was a Swiss politician and member of the Swiss Federal Council (1929–1940). He also was a farmer all his life.

He was elected to the Federal Council on 12 December 1929 and handed over office on 31 December 1940. He was the first councillor from the Party of Farmers, Traders and Independents (BGB/PAI), now the Swiss People's Party.

During his time in office, he held the Military Department and was President of the Confederation in 1935.

External links

Minger Ruedi  Home page for his 125 anniversary

1881 births
1955 deaths
People from Bern-Mittelland District
Swiss Calvinist and Reformed Christians
Party of Farmers, Traders and Independents politicians
Members of the Federal Council (Switzerland)
Members of the National Council (Switzerland)
Presidents of the National Council (Switzerland)